John Hoiles may refer to:

John E. Hoiles (born 1938), Australian rules footballer, father of John M. Hoiles
John M. Hoiles  (born 1961), Australian rules footballer, son of John E. Hoiles